Wei Chaolun (born 21 May 2000) is a Chinese footballer currently playing as a midfielder for Beijing BSU.

Career statistics

Club
.

References

2000 births
Living people
Chinese footballers
Association football midfielders
China League Two players
China League One players
Beijing Sport University F.C. players
Suzhou Dongwu F.C. players